Gustavo Espinosa Espadas Jr. (born September 2, 1974 in Mérida, Yucatán, Mexico) is a Mexican former professional boxer in the Featherweight division. He is the former WBC Featherweight Champion and the son of former WBA Flyweight Champion, Guty Espadas.

Professional career
Espadas Jr. turned professional in 1992.

WBC Featherweight Championship
In 2000 won the Vacant WBC Featherweight Championship by winning a technical decision over Luisito Espinosa in the 11th round.  He defended the belt once before losing a close decision to Erik Morales in 2001.

In 2003 he rematched Morales but was knocked out in the 3rd round.

He announced his retirement after sustaining a 2nd round knockout loss to Rocky Juarez in 2004, only to come out of it in 2007 by beating Moises Perez twice in the same year.

Personal life
Espadas's father, Guty Espadas, was the WBA Flyweight Champion during the 1970s.

See also
Notable boxing families
List of WBC world champions
List of featherweight boxing champions
List of Mexican boxing world champions

External links
 

1974 births
Living people
Featherweight boxers
Boxers from Yucatán (state)
Sportspeople from Mérida, Yucatán
World Boxing Council champions
Mexican male boxers